A nut is a fruit consisting of a hard or tough nutshell protecting a kernel which is usually edible. In general usage and in a culinary sense, a wide variety of dry seeds are called nuts, but in a botanical context "nut" implies that the shell does not open to release the seed (indehiscent).

Most seeds come from fruits that naturally free themselves from the shell, but this is not the case in nuts such as hazelnuts, chestnuts, and acorns, which have hard shell walls and originate from a compound ovary. The general and original usage of the term is less restrictive, and many nuts (in the culinary sense), such as almonds, pecans, pistachios, walnuts, and Brazil nuts, are not nuts in a botanical sense. Common usage of the term often refers to any hard-walled, edible kernel as a nut. Nuts are an energy-dense and nutrient-rich food source.

Botanical definition 

A seed is the mature fertilised ovule of a plant; it consists of three parts, the embryo which will develop into a new plant, stored food for the embryo, and a protective seed coat. Botanically, a nut is a fruit with a woody pericarp developing from a syncarpous gynoecium. Nuts may be contained in an involucre, a cup-shaped structure formed from the flower bracts. The involucre may be scaly, spiny, leafy or tubular, depending on the species of nut. Most nuts come from the pistils with inferior ovaries (see flower) and all are indehiscent (not opening at maturity). True nuts are produced, for example, by some plant families of the order Fagales. These include beech (Fagus), chestnut (Castanea), oak (Quercus), stone-oak (Lithocarpus) and tanoak (Notholithocarpus) in the family Fagaceae, as well as hazel, filbert (Corylus) and hornbeam (Carpinus) in the family Betulaceae.

Also widely known as nuts are dry drupes, which include pecans (Carya illinoensis), almonds (Prunus amygdalus), macadamia (Macadamia integrifolia), candlenut (Aleurites moluccanus), water caltrop (Trapa bicornis) and walnuts (Juglans regia). A drupe is an indehiscent fruit which has an outer fleshy part consisting of the exocarp, or skin, and mesocarp, or flesh, which surround a single pit or stone, the endocarp with a seed (kernel) inside. In a dry drupe, the outer parts dry up and the remaining husk is part of the ovary wall or pericarp, and the hard inner wall surrounding the seed represents the inner part of the pericarp.

A small nut may be called a "nutlet" (or nucule, a term otherwise referring to the oogonium of stoneworts). In botany, the term "nutlet" specifically refers to a pyrena or pyrene, which is a seed covered by a stony layer, such as the kernel of a drupe. Walnuts and hickories (Juglandaceae) have fruits that are difficult to classify. They are considered to be nuts under some definitions but are also referred to as drupaceous nuts.

In common use, a "tree nut" is, as the name implies, any nut coming from a tree. This most often comes up regarding food allergies; a person may be allergic specifically to peanuts (which are not tree nuts but legumes), whereas others may be allergic to the wider range of nuts that grow on trees.

Production

In the 21st century, some dozen species constitute most of the worldwide production of nuts, shown in the table below for major commercial nuts.

Food and health effects

Nuts contain the diverse nutrients that are needed for the growth of a new plant. Composition varies, but they tend to have a low water and carbohydrate content, with high levels of fats, protein, dietary minerals, and vitamins. The digestibility of the protein at about 90% is slightly lower than that of meat and fish, but can be improved by thorough chewing. The fats are largely unsaturated and nuts are a source of essential omega-3 fatty acids. As part of a healthy human diet, long-term consumption of diverse nutrients in nuts may contribute to a lower risk of cardiovascular diseases, reduced levels of blood cholesterol, and lower all-cause mortality. For vegetarians and vegans, nuts provide many of the essential nutrients which may be in short supply in other plant foods.

Nuts supply nutrients for humans and wildlife. Because nuts generally have a high oil content, they are a significant energy source. Many seeds are edible by humans and used in cooking, eaten raw, sprouted, or roasted as a snack food, ground to make nut butters, or pressed for oil that is used in cooking and cosmetics.

Nuts used for food are a common source of food allergens. Reactions can range from mild symptoms to severe ones, a condition known as anaphylaxis, which can be life-threatening. The reaction is due to the release of histamine by the body in response to an allergen in the nuts, causing skin and other possible reactions. Many experts suggest that a person with an allergy to peanuts should avoid eating tree nuts, and vice versa.

Nutrition

Constituents
Nuts are the source of energy and nutrients for the new plant. They contain a relatively large quantity of calories, essential unsaturated and monounsaturated fats including linoleic acid and linolenic acid, vitamins, and essential amino acids. Many nuts are good sources of vitamin E, vitamin B2, folate, fiber, and essential minerals, such as magnesium, phosphorus, potassium, copper, and selenium.

This table lists the percentage of various nutrients in four unroasted seeds.

Research
Nuts are under preliminary research to assess whether their consumption is associated with lower risk for some diseases, such as cardiovascular diseases and cancer. A 2014 review indicated that consuming one or more servings of nuts or peanut butter per day was associated with lower risk of ischemic heart disease, overall cardiovascular disease, stroke in women, and all-cause mortality. A 2022 umbrella review confirmed these findings and found a 22% reduction in all-cause mortality.

See also

References

Further reading
Albala, Ken (2014) Nuts A Global History. The Edible Series.

External links
 

Fruit morphology
 
Snack foods
Vegan cuisine
Vegetarian cuisine
Christmas food
Staple foods
Types of food